Dressed Up as Life is the second studio album released by the Australian alternative rock band Sick Puppies, but was their first album to be released in the United States. It was released on 3 April 2007 and peaked at No. 181 on the US Billboard 200 albums chart. The song "All the Same" is the theme for Juan Mann's Free Hugs Campaign video on YouTube, although it also has its own video. Deutsch Advertising creatives Michael Leibowitz and Eric Rojas oversaw the CD design for Dressed Up as Life.

The album has sold over 150,000 copies in the United States to date. This is also the band's first studio album with drummer Mark Goodwin, who replaced Chris Mileski in 2003.

Track listing

Outtakes
Pathogen (3:03)

Shards (3:43)

Personnel
Sick Puppies
Shim Moore – lead vocals, guitars
Emma Anzai – bass, backing vocals
Mark Goodwin – drums

Chart performance

Album

Singles

References

Sick Puppies albums
2007 albums
Albums produced by Rock Mafia
Virgin Records albums